Rhodesia is a genus of moths in the family Geometridae described by William Warren in 1905.

Species
Species in this genus are:
Rhodesia alboviridata (Saalmüller, 1880)
Rhodesia depompata Prout, 1913
Rhodesia viridalbata Warren, 1905

References

Warren (1905). "New African Thyrididae, Uraniidae, and Geometridae". Novitates Zoologicae. 12: 380–409.

Geometridae